Michael or Mike Hopkins may refer to:

Sports
 Mike Hopkins (baseball) (1872–1952), baseball player
 Mike Hopkins (basketball) (born 1969), American basketball coach who played at Syracuse
 Michael Hopkins (basketball) (born 1960), American former basketball coach who played at Coastal College

Other people
 Michael Hopkins (architect) (born 1935), English architect
 Michael J. Hopkins (born 1958), American mathematician
 Michael S. Hopkins (born 1968), NASA astronaut
 Mike Hopkins (sound editor) (1959–2012), sound editor for The Lord of the Rings: The Two Towers and King Kong
 Mike Hopkins (politician), member of the Montana House of Representatives